Sowerbyella radiculata is a species of apothecial fungus belonging to the family Pyronemataceae. The typical form appears as yellowish cups up to 5 cm in diameter usually on soil close to coniferous trees. A distinctive form, var. kewensis, is usually larger (up to 10 cm across) and often associated with broad-leaved trees. This is an uncommon European species.

References

 Sowerbyella radiculata at GBIF

Pyronemataceae
Fungi described in 1797